"L'envie d'aimer" is a 2000 song recorded by French-born singer Daniel Lévi and the troupe of The Ten Commandments. Released as first single from the album Les Dix Commandements in June 2000, the song was a smash hit and the most successful single from the musical. The song is currently among the biggest selling singles of all time in France.

Background and structure
The album version of the song is extended (6:28) and contains many choirs from the troupe. Written and composed by Pascal Obispo, Lionel Florence, who had already several number-one hits in France such as "Savoir aimer" and "Tu ne m'as pas laissé le temps", Serge Guirao, who had written for Art Mengo, the song was very moving. An expert of French charts made this analysis of the song : "With the text of the verses, spaced out and almost minimal, [Lévi] murmurs, he speaks in a low voice, he sings hardly, a moderation which the sweetness of wind instruments blows him. And it is not due to a lack of voice : this one, disturbing of power and color, asks only to spread and the vowels of the tune are there for this."

Chart performances and awards
In France, the single failed to reach #1, but went straight to #2 on June 10, 2002 and stayed there for six weeks, being unable to dislodge Yannick's hit "Ces Soirées-là". The song remained for 30 weeks in the top ten and 51 weeks on the chart (top 100), which is to date one of the records in terms of chart trajectory. In Belgium (Wallonia), the song peaked at #2 for six weeks and fell off the chart (top 40) after 36 weeks, 25 of them in the top ten.

In 2001, the song was awarded 'Original song of the year' at the Victoires de la Musique.

Cover versions
The song was covered by Éric Morena in 2003 on the album 	Retour gagnant which was composed of cover versions by famous 1980s artists. The same year, the song was covered by Julien Clerc, Patrick Fiori, Catherine Lara and Liane Foly on Les Enfoirés' album La Foire des Enfoirés. In 2002, Céline Dion released a version in English under the title "The Greatest Reward" on her album A New Day Has Come. In 2006, the song was used as soundtrack of the 2006 film Comme t'y es belle !. In 2007, Greek French television presenter Nikos Aliagas recorded a Greek version of the song with Elena Paparizou, for his Greek duet album titled Rendez-Vous. The track was released as a single, accompanied by a music video. In 2013, Pascal Obispo covered the song on his best of Millésimes.

Track listings
 CD single
 "L'envie d'aimer" — 5:10
 "Mais tu t'en vas" by Nourith, Lisbet Guldbaek, Ginie Line, Yaël — 5:34

Charts and sales

Peak positions

Year-end charts

Certifications and sales

References

2000 songs
Daniel Lévi songs
Pop ballads
Songs from musicals
Songs with music by Pascal Obispo
Songs written by Lionel Florence
2000 singles
Mercury Records singles
Songs with lyrics by Patrice Guirao